The California High-Speed Rail Authority (CHSRA) is a California state agency established pursuant to the California High-Speed Rail Act to develop and implement high-speed intercity rail service, namely the California High-Speed Rail project.

Members
The Authority is composed of 9 regular members plus 2 ex officio members. Five members are appointed by the Governor, two members are appointed by the Senate Committee on Rules, and two members are appointed by the Speaker of the Assembly. The two ex officio members are from each of the two legislative bodies.

The members appointed by the Governor have terms of office of 4 years. Per Katta Hules of the California High-Speed Rail Authority, members whose terms of office have technically expired serve until replaced. As of Jan. 2023 the Board was composed of:

Committees
The Board has established four standing committees. However, it appears only the Finance and Audit Committee is active at this time.
 Executive/Administrative Committee (there is no link to this committee)
 Finance and Audit Committee
 Operations Committee (there is no link to this committee)
 Transit and Land Use Committee (only data from 2017 and 2018 is shown)

Criticisms

As noted in James Fallows' third article (in 2014) in his series on California's High-Speed Rail project, the Authority was seen as not very effective and possibly even mis-managing the project. Dan Richard, the new Authority chair appointed by Gov. Brown, made this comment for inclusion in his article concerning this charge:

When Jerry Brown came in (in his third term as governor), the HSR program was rife with problems. The organization was at half-strength, the board was dysfunctional, there was a high level of criticism from independent groups evaluating ridership and plans.

All of that has turned around. The board is highly cohesive and professional. The staff is now at full strength with a highly capable day-to-day CEO, top flight engineering, risk management and program leadership. We have the most sophisticated risk management program likely to be found in any public infrastructure program. Our cost data and risk assessments are now presented publicly on a regular basis at our board meetings and are in accessible form on our website. Our CEO put in excellent local project leaders and former critics have lauded the openness and responsiveness of that team.

Here's a quote from the Independent Peer Review Group, established by the California Legislature. The PRG was highly critical of past plans. No more:

"We believe that the Authority has made manifest progress in all areas of planning and management since the Revised 2012 Business Plan. This assessment applies to risk management, demand forecasting, operating and maintenance (O&M) cost modeling and the analysis of the impact of HSR on California's greenhouse gas emissions."

References

External links

High-Speed Rail Authority
Government agencies established in 1996
California High-Speed Rail
1996 establishments in California
California State Transportation Agency